George Johnson may refer to:

Arts and entertainment
George W. Johnson (singer) (1846–1914), American singer, early recording artist
George Perry Johnson (1885–1977), American film producer, writer, and newsreel producer
George Johnson (actor) (1898–1961), American actor
George Johnson (musician) (1913–1987), jazz saxophonist and clarinetist
George Johnson (artist) (1926–2021), Australian artist
George M. Johnson (writer), American author and activist
George Johnson (aka Lightnin' Licks, born 1953), American musician, member of The Brothers Johnson

Military
George Owen Johnson (1896–1980), Canadian aviator, RCAF Air Marshal and WWI ace
George Johnson (British Army officer) (1903–1980)
George Johnson (general) (1918–2021), United States Air Force general
Johnny Johnson (RAF officer) (George Leonard Johnson, 1921–2022), Royal Air Force officer

Politics

Canada
George Macness Johnson (1853–1935), judge and politician in Newfoundland
George Balfour Johnson (1865–1940), politician in Saskatchewan, Canada
George William Johnson (politician) (1892–1973), Canadian Member of Legislative Assembly from Manitoba
George Johnson (Manitoba politician) (1920–1995), Canadian Lieutenant-Governor of Manitoba

U.S.
George W. Johnson (governor) (1811–1862), Confederate Governor of Kentucky
George Y. Johnson (1820–1872), New York politician
George Alonzo Johnson (1824–1903), 49er, Colorado River steamboat entrepreneur and California politician
George A. Johnson & Company
George A. Johnson (1829–1894), Attorney General of the State of California
George William Johnson (congressman) (1869–1944), American congressman from West Virginia
George E. Q. Johnson (1874–1949), U.S. federal judge
George W. Johnson (Minnesota politician) (1894–1974), Speaker of the Minnesota House of Representatives and 28th Mayor of Duluth, Minnesota
George R. Johnson (1929–1973), Pennsylvania politician
George Dean Johnson Jr. (born 1942), member of the South Carolina House of Representatives
George F. Johnson IV (born c. 1953), American politician and sheriff

Other politicians
George Johnson (MP for Devizes) (1626–1683)
George Johnson (Australian politician) (1811–1902), member of the Victorian Legislative Assembly
George Randall Johnson (1833–1919), British cricketer who was a member of the New Zealand Legislative Council
George Johnson (Independent Labour Party politician) (1872–1958), British socialist politician

Sports

Association football
George Johnson (footballer, born 1871) (1871–1934), English football forward (Walsall, Aston Villa)
George Johnson (footballer, born 1907) (1907–1989), English football fullback (Wigan Borough, Darlington)
George Johnson (football manager), Leicester City manager

Basketball
George E. Johnson (basketball) (born 1947), American ABA/NBA player
George T. Johnson (born 1948), American NBA player
George L. Johnson (born 1956), American NBA player

Other sports
George S. Johnson (1879–1948), Australian rules footballer
George Johnson (baseball) (1890–1940), American baseball outfielder in the Negro leagues
George Johnson (cricketer, born 1894) (1894–1965), English cricketer
George Johnson (cricketer, born 1907) (1907–1986), English cricketer
George Johnson (sport shooter) (1915–2006), Puerto Rican Olympic shooter
George Johnson (athlete) (born 1938), Liberian athlete
George Johnson (boxer) (1938–2016), American heavyweight boxer
George Johnson (American football) (born 1989), American football defensive end
George Johnson (American football coach), head football coach at Bucknell University from 1915 to 1917
Chappie Johnson (George Johnson, 1877–1949), American baseball player and team manager, Negro leagues career 1896–1919

Writers
George William Johnson (writer) (1802–1886), British writer
George Metcalf Johnson (1885–1965), American mystery and western writer, also wrote as George Metcalf
George Clayton Johnson (1929–2015), American science fiction writer
George B. Johnson (born 1942), American science writer
George Johnson (writer) (born 1952), American science writer, including for The New York Times

Others
George Johnson (priest) (1808–1881), British clergyman and academic
George Henry Martin Johnson (1816–1884), Iroquois chief
George Johnson (physician) (1818–1896), English physician
George Raymond Johnson (1840–1898), English architect in Australia
George Lindsay Johnson (1853–1943), British ophthalmologist
George F. Johnson (1857–1948), American businessman
George Marion Johnson (1900–1987), American law professor and academic administrator
George E. Johnson Sr. (born 1927), American entrepreneur
George W. Johnson (academic) (1928–2017), American academic and academic administrator

Other uses
, a United States Navy destroyer escort in commission from 1944 to 1946 and from 1950 to 1957
, the proposed name and designation of a commercial freight lighter the United States Navy considered for service during World War I but never acquired
George P. Johnson, an American multinational corporation

See also
George Johnston (disambiguation)
George Johnstone (disambiguation)